Michel Edmond Moussié (26 March 1888 – 8 October 1933) was a sailor from France, who represented his country at the 1924 Summer Olympics in Le Havre, France.

References

Sources
 
 

French male sailors (sport)
Sailors at the 1924 Summer Olympics – 6 Metre
Olympic sailors of France
1888 births
1933 deaths
Sportspeople from Bordeaux